The Dakar Biennale, or Dak'Art - Biennale de l'Art Africain Contemporain, is a major contemporary art exhibition that takes place once every two years in Dakar, Senegal. Dak'Art's focus has been on Contemporary African Art since 1996.

History 
The Dakar Biennale was conceived in 1989 as a biennale alternating between literature and art. The first edition in 1990 was focused on literature and in 1992 on visual art. In 1993 the structure of the biennale was transformed and Dak'Art 1996 became an exhibition specifically devoted to Contemporary African Art. In 1998 the structure was consolidated and in 2000 there was considerable change: Abdoulaye Wade was elected president of Senegal a few months before the opening of the event. The new president confirmed the support of the Senegalese government for the event and since 2000, Dak'Art has taken place bi-annually. Dak'Art 2002 was characterized by new staff and new partners. Dak'Art 2004 received more international visitors and wider press coverage; during the opening the president announced his intention to organise a new edition of the World Festival of Black Arts. For the first time an artistic director was appointed for Dak'Art 2006 and the event was organised with the participation of many artists and a more consistent budget. In 2008 the biennale decelerated. The event took place on a smaller budget and was organised at the last minute. In 2010 the European Commission - a major financial partner - did not support the event. In December the third edition of the World Festival of Black Arts was organised in Dakar. The 2014 edition was curated by Abdelkader Damani, Elise Atangana and Ugochukwu-Smooth Nzewi. The 2016 and 2018 editions were both curated by Simon Njami.

Dak'Art is the African continent's longest running grand-scale art event. In 2014, it was opened to non-African nationals for the first time, with the exhibition 'Cultural Diversity' at the IFAN Theodore Monod Museum including invited internationals.

Editions 

1990 Dakar Biennale 1990. First edition focused on literature.
1992 . First edition focused on visual art.
1996 . First edition focused on Contemporary African Art.
1998 . Third edition.
2000 . Fourth edition.
2002 . Fifth edition.
2004 . Sixth edition.
2006 . Seventh edition and first edition with an artistic director.
2008 . Eighth edition.
2010 . Ninth edition and twentieth anniversary.
2012 . Tenth edition. 
2014 Dak'Art 2014. Eleventh edition.
 2016 Dak'Art 2016. Twelfth edition.
 2018 Dak'Art 2018. Thirteenth edition.

Bibliography 
 Rasheed Araeen, DAK'ART - 1992-2002 in "Third Text", 17, n°. 1 (2003), p. 93.
 Ndiouga Benga, Mise en scène de la culture et espace public au Sénégal, 1960-2000, Université Cheikh Anta Diop, Dakar, 2008 (Ndiouga Benga, Mise en scène de la culture et espace public au Senegal. In: Africa Development, vol. 35, no. 4 (2010), p. 237-260)
 Mongo Beti, L'ETRANGE BIENNALE DE DAKAR... LETTRE OUVERTE A MONSIEUR LE MINISTRE DE LA CULTURE ET DE LA COMMUNICATION DU SENEGAL in "Peuples Noires Peuples Africains", n°. 63, 1988, p. 310-314.
 Nathalie Diserens Dubach, Eva-Maria Schädler, KUNST(T)RÄUME. Gespräche mit drei Künstlergruppen im Kontext der Biennale Dak'Art 2004 in Dakar, VDM, Verlag Dr. Müller, Saarbrücken, 2011.
 Youma Fall, La Biennale de Dakar: Impact sociale et culturel, Université Erfurt, Dicembre 01/12/2009.
 Elizabeth Harney, In Senghor’s Shadow: Art, Politics, and the Avant-Garde in Senegal, 1960–1995, Duke University Press, Durham & London, 2004.
 Yacouba Konaté, Dak’art: Centralization Effects of a Peripheral Biennale presentato al Curating the Other – Curator as Tourist, Dartington College of Arts, Dartington, UK, Aprile 21, 2007.
 Yacouba Konaté, La biennale de Dakar: pour une esthétique de la création contemporaine africaine : tête à tête avec Adorno, L'Harmattan, 2009
 Iolanda Pensa, La Biennale di Dakar, tesi di laurea, relatore Luciano Caramel e correlatore Francesco Tedeschi, Università Cattolica di Milano, Laurea in lettere e filosofia, 2003 (CC-BY-SA).
 Cédric Vincent, Le grand défi de Dak'art, c'est l'élargissement de son public - entretien de Cédric Vincent avec Rémi Sagna in Africultures, dossier Festivals et biennales d'Afrique : machine ou utopie?

See also 
 Contemporary African Art
 World Festival of Black Arts

References

External links 

 

 
Art biennials
Art exhibitions in Senegal
Senegalese contemporary art
Archives in Senegal
Buildings and structures in Dakar
Arts organizations based in Africa
Arts organizations established in 1990
Recurring events established in 1990
1990 establishments in Senegal
Art festivals in Africa
Events in Dakar